, also written as (95625) 2002 GX32, is a trans-Neptunian object that resides in the Kuiper belt. It has a 3:7 resonance with Neptune. It was discovered on April 8, 2002 by Marc W. Buie, Amy B. Jordan, and James L. Elliot.

It came to perihelion in 1997.

Assuming a generic TNO albedo of 0.09, it is about 153 km in diameter.

Resonance
Simulations by Emel'yanenko and Kiseleva in 2007 show that  has a 99% probability of libration in a 3:7 resonance with Neptune.

The Neptune 3:7 mean-motion resonance keeps it more than 11 AU from Neptune over a 14000-year period.

It has been observed 21 times over 4 oppositions and has an orbit quality code of 3.

References

External links 
 

095625
Discoveries by Marc Buie
Discoveries by Amy B. Jordan (astronomer)
Discoveries by James L. Elliot
095625
20020408